Paul Walter Myers (17 July 1932 - 1 May 2015) was a classical record producer who worked for CBS, Decca Records and Naxos. He worked with conductor George Szell of the Cleveland Orchestra, the pianist Glenn Gould, and the guitarist John Williams. Myers was the author of the "Deadly" series of mystery novels set in the world of classical music.

Selected publications
Deadly Variations. 1985.
Deadly Cadenza. 1986.
Deadly Aria. 1987.
Deadly Sonata. 1987.
Deadly Score. 1988.
Deadly Crescendo. 1989.
Concerto. Century, London, 1993. 
Leonard Bernstein. Phaidon Press, London, 1998.

Discography
 French Opera Arias, with Frederica von Stade and the London Philharmonic Orchestra, conducted by John Pritchard, Columbia, 1976
 Song Recital, with Frederica von Stade and Martin Katz, Columbia, 1978
 Jules Massenet: Cendrillon, with Elizabeth Bainbridge, Jules Bastin, Jane Berbié, Teresa Cahill, Nicolai Gedda, Frederica von Stade, Ruth Welting, the Ambrosian Opera Chorus and the Philharmonia Orchestra, conducted by Julius Rudel, Columbia, 1979
 Italian Opera Arias, with Frederica von Stade, Janice Taylor and the National Arts Centre Orchestra, conducted by Mario Bernardi, Columbia, 1979

References 

1932 births
2015 deaths
English record producers
Musicians from London
20th-century English writers
People educated at Bradfield College
Writers from London